On 10 November 2022, allegations of a gang-rape surfaced at Vedic Village of Rajarhat in West Bengal, India. A 21-year-old girl accused four youths of gang-rape. Four accused youths were arrested on 11 November. Among those arrested in the incident, one is an IT worker and the other three are students.

Incident 
A resort at Vedic Village was booked for 9 November and 10 November to celebrate accused Yogesh Mishra's 23rd birthday. At the request of Yogesh Mishra's female-friend, the complainant attended the party. According to the girl's complaint, she was gang-raped by 4 youths who made her unconscious by giving her drugs along with drinks. After the incident, the girl left Vedic Village on 10 November and filed a complaint against the four accused at Rajarhat police station on 11 November.

Arrests 
According to Rajarhat police station, "Police acted on the complaint, and identified the accused as Yogesh Mishra, Shubham Periwal, Rishik Kumar and Madhav Agarwal and arrested them". They were arrested by multiple police teams from the Rajarhat Police Station and the Intelligence Division of the Commissionerate. Two of the accused were arrested after a police team intercepted the vehicle at Chinrighata crossing of EM bypass.

The four arrested have been charged under various IPC sections, including 376D (gang-rape). Later on Saturday, the four were produced at Barasat court and sent to seven-day police custody from the court.

References

2022 crimes in India